Theus may refer to:

Theus (surname), includes a list of people with the name
Théus, commune in the Hautes-Alpes department in southeastern France